The Phobos Science Fiction Anthology Volume 3 - All the Rage This Year (2004) is an anthology edited by Keith Olexa.  It contains twelve stories by different writers.  All of them were winners of the 3rd Annual Phobos Fiction Contest for new writer.

Story list 
The short stories in this book are:

"Veil of Ignorance" by David Barr Kirtley
"The Man Who Murdered Himself" by Nancy Fulda
"All the Rage This Year" by David Walton
"And Cry the Name of David" by Virginia Baker
"GoldenTown" by Daniel Conover
"The Second Chance of Clevon Walker" by Eric B. Griffin
"The Man Who Moved the Moon" by Eric James Stone
"The Big Shot" by Susan Fry
"Two Rooms and All the Electricity You Can Eat" by M. T. Reiten
"Dissident" by Julie Hyzy
"The Walls Within" by Lane Robbins 
"Earl Billings and the Angels of the Lord" by James Maxey

Related works
The Phobos Science Fiction Anthology Volume 1
The Phobos Science Fiction Anthology Volume 2

External links
 The official Phobos Books website

2004 anthologies
Science fiction anthology series